Khadija Cohen (née Patman), better known as Yasmeena Ali (Pashto ياسمينه علی ), is a British-Afghan pornographic actress. She is perhaps best known for her involvement in a 2020 criminal case, in which her father and his cousin planned to kill her because of her choice of career and they believed she had converted from Islam to Judaism

Biography 
Ali was born Khadija Patman in a Taliban-controlled area of Kabul on 1 December 1993. When she was seven years old, she moved with her family to England. Her parents raised her as a strict Muslim, at the age of 19 she was kicked out of the family home for dating a Jewish boy.

Ali launched her career when she met pornographic director David Cohen, whom she later married. The two previously lived in Austria and moved to Slovakia in 2017. Ali became embroiled in a criminal case in 2020 when her father and his cousin were arrested for plotting to murder her because she had left Islam and had "disgraced the family" with her choice of career. The British National Crime Agency stated that the two took several trips to Slovakia in 2018 in order to search for her, and that a hitman offered to kill her for $70,000.

Ali now advocates for women's rights and "condemns liberal activists who turn a blind eye to the violation of these rights by Islam".

References

External links
 

Year of birth missing (living people)
Living people
Afghan Jews
Afghan former Muslims
British former Muslims
British Jews
People from Kabul
British pornographic film actresses
Converts to Judaism from Islam